Mohan Sharma is an Indian film and television actor, film producer, director and screenwriter, who works in South Indian films. He has produced more than 15 films in Malayalam, Telugu, Tamil and Kannada. He became noted through his role in Chattakari (1974).

Background 
Mohan Sharma was born in Thathamangalam in Palakkad district, Kerala. His education was completed at Thathamangalam and Chitoor of Palaghat. Afterwards, he joined the Film and Television Institute of India, Pune and graduated in the acting course. He was the first South Indian to get that qualification in acting from the institute. He served three times as National Film Jury member and once as Indian Panorama Jury member.

He fell in love with co-star Lakshmi on the sets of Chattakari and married her in 1975, but it ended in divorce in 1980. Later, he married Shanthi in 1982.

Awards

Kerala State Film Awards 
 2010 Best Story – Gramam

Tamil Nadu State Film Awards 
 2017 Tamil Nadu State Film Award Special Prize – Best Film

Filmography

As an Actor

Malayalam 

Forensic (2020) as Abraham
 Mamangam (2019) as Zamorin
 Red Rain (2013)
 Mayamohini (2012) as Rajkumar Patala
 Gramam (2012) as Mani Swami
 Kalabham (2006)
 Chithariyavar (2005)
 Basket (2002)
 Kuberan (2002)
 Dada Sahib (2000)
 Kaanthavalayam (1980)
 Pratheeksha (1979)
 Kaayalum Kayarum (1979)
 Mathalasa (1979)
 Vyaamoham (1978)
 Agninakshathram (1977)
 Snehayamuna (1977)
 Saritha (1977)
 Sreemad Bhagavadgeetha (1977)
 Priyamvada (1976)
 Paalkkadal (1976)
 Njavalppazhangal (1976)
 Surveykkallu (1976)
 Muthu (1976)
 Missi (1976)
 Udyaanalakshmi (1976)
 Theekkanal (1976)
 Chuvanna Sandhyakal (1975)
 Thomasleeha (1975)
 Chalanam (1975)
 Prayanam (1975)
 Raagam (1975)
 Jeevikkaan Marannu Poya Sthree (1974)
 Chattakari (1974)
 Ashwathi (1974)
 Nellu (1974)
 Brahmachaari (1972)
 Panimudakku (1972) as Venu

Tamil 

 Akkarai Pachai (1974)
 Nadakame Ulagam (1977)
 General Chakravarthi (1978)
 Enippadigal (1979)
 Thoondil Meen (1980)
 Nadhi Ondru Karai Moondru (1980)
 Uyirodu Uyiraga (1998)
 Kannedhirey Thondrinal (1998)
 Suyamvaram (1999)
 Appu (2000)
 Dosth (2001)
 Friends (2001)
 Raajjiyam (2002)
 Yai! Nee Romba Azhaga Irukke! (2002)
 Parthiban Kanavu (2003)
 Sachien (2005)
 Thavam (2019)

Hindi 

 Wafadaar (1980)
 Sur Sangam (1980)
 Dream Girl (1977)

Telugu 

 Saagara Sangamam (Jaya Pradha's husband)
 Bava Bhakti
 Hima Bindu
 Mantra Sakti
 Veta

Kannada 

 Sedina Hakki
 Ibani Karagithu

Direction 
 Gramam (Malayalam) 2012
 Namma Gramam (Tamil) 2012

Production 
 Ivide Thudangunnu (1984)
 Bandham (1983)
 Sedina Hakki (1985)

Screenplay 
 Graamam (2012)

Story 
 Graamam (2012)
 Bandham (1983)

Dialogue 
 Graamam (2012)

As a playback singer 
 "Munnil Njaaninmel" ... Bandham 1983
 "Janichappozhe" ... Bandham 1983
 "Ennomal sodarikku" ... Ivide Thudangunnu	1984
 "Thaanaaro thannaaro" ... Ivide Thudangunnu 1984
 "Etho swapnam pole" ... Ivide Thudangunnu 1984
 "Neeyente jeevanaanomale" ...	Ivide Thudangunnu 1984

Television

References 
http://www.thehindu.com/features/cinema/frames-of-memory/article3580841.ece
http://entertainment.oneindia.in/celebs/mohan-sharma.html
http://indianscreenstars.blogspot.com.au/2012/01/mohan-sharma.html
http://www.malayalachalachithram.com/profiles.php?i=882

External links 
Mohan Sharma at MSI

Male actors from Kerala
Malayalam film directors
Malayalam screenwriters
Kerala State Film Award winners
Male actors in Malayalam cinema
Male actors in Tamil cinema
Male actors in Telugu cinema
Indian male film actors
Male actors in Hindi cinema
Male actors in Kannada cinema
Living people
20th-century Indian male actors
21st-century Indian male actors
Film and Television Institute of India alumni
Non-Malayali Keralites
People from Palakkad district
Indian male television actors
Male actors in Malayalam television
Male actors in Hindi television
Tamil male television actors
1947 births